Luzia Premoli S.M.C (born 23 March 1955), is a Brazilian Roman Catholic nun and missionary, Superior General of the Comboni Missionary Sisters between 2010 and 2016 and the second female appointed in an office of the Roman Curia after Enrica Rosanna.

Biography
Born in Linhares, Brazil, Luzia Premoli joined the Congregation of the Comboni Missionary Sisters and in 1983 took the temporal vows. After studying psychology she worked from 1989 to 1997 in Mozambique for an educational program for women. She was also involved in academic education at the inter-diocesan seminary and in teaching. In 1997, Luzia Premoli worked for the novice training of her order in Brazil and completed a degree in psycho-pedagogy. In 2005 she was elected Provincial Superior of the Comboni Missionary Sisters in the Province of Brazil.

The XIX. General Chapter of the Order chosen Luzia Premoli on 20 September 2010 in Verona as its new Superior General, becoming the first non-Italian in this Order.

On 13 September 2014, Pope Francis appointed her member of the Congregation for the Evangelization of Peoples and thus she became the second woman ever to occupy an office of the Roman Curia but first to be appointed a member of a Vatican congregation (which is one of the higher ranking departments of the Roman Curia). On 21 September 2016, she was succeeded by Luigia Coccia as head of the Combonians Sisters.

References 

1955 births
Living people
Officials of the Roman Curia
Women officials of the Roman Curia
Superiors general
Comboni Missionary Sisters
Female Roman Catholic missionaries
Members of the Congregation for the Evangelization of Peoples
20th-century Brazilian Roman Catholic nuns
21st-century Brazilian Roman Catholic nuns